Bobsleigh is an Olympic sport that is contested at the Winter Olympic Games. The sport was included in the first Winter Olympics in 1924 and has been held at every Olympics since, except 1960. The four-man event, which was first held in 1924, was switched to a five-man event in 1928. The two-man event was introduced at the 1932 Lake Placid games and a two-woman event was first contested at the 2002 Salt Lake City Olympics.

Four-man
The numbers in brackets denotes bobsledders who won gold medal in corresponding disciplines more than one time. Bold numbers denotes record number of victories in certain disciplines.

Medals:

Two-man
The numbers in brackets denotes bobsledders who won gold medal in corresponding disciplines more than one time. Bold numbers denotes record number of victories in certain disciplines.

Medals:

Two-woman
The numbers in brackets denotes bobsledders who won gold medal in corresponding disciplines more than one time. Bold numbers denotes record number of victories in certain disciplines.

Medals:

Women's monobob

Statistics

Medal table

Bobsledders medal leaders

Men

Women

* denotes all Olympics in which mentioned athletes took part. Boldface denotes latest Olympics.
** Status: B - participated at Olympics as brakeman, P - participated at Olympics as pilot, B/P - participated at Olympics both as brakeman and as pilot.

Most successful bobsledders
Top 10 most successful bobsledders (by number of victories) at the Winter Olympics are listed below. Boldface denotes active bobsledders and highest medal count among all bobsledders (including these who not included in these tables) per type.

Men

Women

* denotes only those Olympics at which mentioned biathletes won at least one medal 
** Status: B - won Olympic medals as brakeman, P - won Olympic medals as Olympics as pilot, B/P - won Olympic medals both as brakeman and as pilot.

Medals per year

 bolded numbers indicate the highest medal count at that year's Olympic Games.

Medal sweep events
These are events in which athletes from one NOC won all three medals.

See also
IBSF World Championships
Bobsleigh World Cup

References

General

Specific

medalists

Bobsleigh